State Route 185 (SR 185) is a state highway in the San Francisco Bay Area of the U.S. state of California. It runs along sections of Mission Boulevard in Hayward, East 14th Street in San Leandro and International Boulevard in Oakland. At its south end, SR 185 connects with State Routes 92 and 238 in Hayward. At the north end of SR 185 at International Boulevard and 42nd Avenue, the short State Route 77 (SR 77) heads southwest to Interstate 880.

Route description
The south end of SR 185 is defined to be at State Route 92 (Jackson St) in Hayward. However, state control of the segment in Hayward south of A Street was relinquished to the city in 2010. The City of Hayward has since re-configured the segment of Mission Boulevard from A Street south to SR 92 as part of the one-way pair known as the "Hayward Loop" (part of State Route 238). Traffic in the Hayward Loop travels one-way northbound on Foothill Boulevard, and one-way southbound on A Street and Mission Boulevard. Due to the lack of signage around the loop after it was completed, it is unclear whether this loop is also part of SR 185 or not (under California Streets and Highways Code § 485, the city is only required to maintain "signs directing motorists to the continuation of Route 185").

SR 185 then heads northwest on Mission Boulevard and East 14th Street, crossing under Interstate 238, and meeting the east end of State Route 112 (signed as State Route 61) in downtown San Leandro.

The north end of SR 185 lies just northwest of High Street in Oakland at 42nd Avenue, where the short State Route 77 heads southwest to Interstate 880. SR 77 was originally signed as SR 185 from SR 185's terminus to I-880; as of August 2008, Caltrans had erected SR 77 shields in place of SR 185 shields as reassurance markers and freeway entrance signage at SR 77's two onramps. SR 77 was originally a freeway; however, as of 2011, the interchange with I-880 had been converted to consist of intersections, as part of the I-880 High Street Seismic Retrofit Project, therefore SR 77 can no longer be considered a freeway.

The 0.35 mi (0.72 km) State Route 77 is part of a planned 13.8 mi (22.2 km) route, which would have run from I-880 northeast past SR 185 to Interstate 580 near High Street. There, it would have turned northwest on I-580 toward Park Boulevard, splitting there to head northeast and north to State Route 24 near Lafayette.

Only the part east of unbuilt State Route 93 west of Moraga is part of the California Freeway and Expressway System; this does not include the constructed part, which was built as a short freeway. SR 185 is part of the National Highway System, a network of highways that are considered essential to the country's economy, defense, and mobility by the Federal Highway Administration.

History

In 1996, the city of Oakland renamed its portion of East 14th Street as International Boulevard to acknowledge the cultural diversity of the route, and to address the stigma of the segment being seen as a high-crime area.

In 2012, the California legislature relinquished control of SR 185 in Downtown Hayward between SR 92/SR 238 and A Street to local control. In March 2013, this segment became part of a one way circulation known as the "Hayward Loop", designed to improve traffic flow between SR 92, SR 185 and SR 238.

Major intersections

See also

References

External links

California @ AARoads.com - State Route 185
Caltrans: Route 185 highway conditions
California Highways: SR 185

185
State Route 185
State Route 185
San Leandro, California
Transportation in Hayward, California

es:Ruta Estatal de California 185#Recorrido